Ottnang am Hausruck is a municipality in the district of Vöcklabruck in the Austrian state of Upper Austria.

Population

Notable people
Barbara Prammer, President of the National Council of Austria since 2006, is a native of the municipality.

References

External links
 Ottnang am Hausruck village school

Cities and towns in Vöcklabruck District